Arindam Sarkar (born 12 August 1973) is an Indian former cricketer. He played 28 first-class matches for Bengal between 1994 and 2003.

See also
 List of Bengal cricketers

References

External links
 

1973 births
Living people
Indian cricketers
Bengal cricketers
Cricketers from Kolkata